The N74 road is a national secondary road in Ireland. It runs for its entire length in County Tipperary, east to west from Cashel to Tipperary town, passing through the villages of Golden, Thomastown and Kilfeakle. 

It also connects the N24 which passes through Tipperary Town with the M8 at Cashel.

See also
Roads in Ireland 
Motorways in Ireland
National primary road
Regional road

References
Roads Act 1993 (Classification of National Roads) Order 2006 – Department of Transport

National secondary roads in the Republic of Ireland
Roads in County Tipperary